Zhuyehai station, is a station of Line 1 of Wuhan Metro. It opened on September 17, 2014. It is located in Qiaokou District.

Near the station
IKEA store

Station layout

Transfers
Bus transfers to Route 218, 222, 505, 546, 560, 621, 736, 737, 741 are available at Zhuyehai station.

References

Wuhan Metro stations
Line 1, Wuhan Metro
Railway stations in China opened in 2014